Rhinacanthus is a genus of plants in the family Acanthaceae. It contains the following species (but this list may be incomplete):

 Rhinacanthus albus Roxb.) Voigt
 Rhinacanthus angulicaulis  I.Darbysh.
 Rhinacanthus beesianus  Diels 
 Rhinacanthus breviflorus  Benoist
 Rhinacanthus calcaratus  Nees
 Rhinacanthus chiovendae 
 Rhinacanthus communis  Nees
 Rhinacanthus dewevrei  De Wild. & T.Durand
 Rhinacanthus dichotomus  (Lindau) I.Darbysh.
 Rhinacanthus gracilis  Klotzsch
 Rhinacanthus grandiflorus  Dunn
 Rhinacanthus humilis  Benoist
 Rhinacanthus kaokoensis  K.Balkwill & S.Williamson
 Rhinacanthus latilabiatus  (K.Balkwill) I.Darbysh.
 Rhinacanthus macilentus  C.Presl
 Rhinacanthus minimus  S.Moore
 Rhinacanthus mucronatus  Ensermu
 Rhinacanthus nasuta  Kurz
 Rhinacanthus nasutus  Kuntze
 Rhinacanthus ndorensis  Schweinf. & Mildbr.
 Rhinacanthus oblongus  Nees
 Rhinacanthus obtusifolius  (Heine) I.Darbysh.
 Rhinacanthus osmospermus  T.Anderson
 Rhinacanthus parviflorus  T.Anderson ex De Wild. & T.Durand
 Rhinacanthus perrieri  Benoist
 Rhinacanthus polonnaruwensis  L.H.Cramer
 Rhinacanthus pulcher  Milne-Redh.
 Rhinacanthus rottlerianus  Nees
 Rhinacanthus rotundifolius  C.B.Clarke
 Rhinacanthus scoparius  Balf.f.
 Rhinacanthus selousensis 
 Rhinacanthus subcaudatus  C.B.Clarke
 Rhinacanthus submontanus  T.Harris & I.Darbysh.
 Rhinacanthus tenuipes  (S.Moore) Aké Assi
 Rhinacanthus tubulosus  C.Presl
 Rhinacanthus virens  (Nees) Milne-Redh.
 Rhinacanthus xerophilus  A.Meeuse

 
Acanthaceae genera
Taxonomy articles created by Polbot